"En säng av rosor" is a song written by Darin and Peter Kvint. It was recorded by Darin Zanyar and released as a digital single on 7 February 2020. The song entered Svensktoppen on 23 February 2020.

Charts

Weekly charts

Year-end charts

Certifications

References

2020 songs
2020 singles
Darin (singer) songs
Songs written by Darin (singer)
Swedish-language songs
Songs written by Peter Kvint